American Review was a literary journal published from 1967 to 1977 under editor Ted Solotaroff. It was initially called New American Review, published and distributed as a paperback book by the New American Library, and while it continued publication at Simon & Schuster, but shortened its name to American Review when it moved to Bantam Books in 1973.

American Review printed traditional and experimental fiction, poetry, and nonfiction essays and journalism. It was unusual for the number of well-known and later-known writers it attracted from its very first issue. Its list of contributors includes Anna Akhmatova, Woody Allen, A. Alvarez, A. R. Ammons, Max Apple, John Ashbery, Russell Banks, Donald Barthelme, Marshall Berman, John Berryman, Jorge Luis Borges, Harold Brodkey, Robert Coover, George Dennison, E. L. Doctorow, Richard Eberhart, Stanley Elkin, Ralph Ellison, Leslie Epstein, William Gass, Richard Gilman, Allen Ginsberg, Albert Goldman, Günter Grass, Robert Graves, Peter Handke, Michael Herr, Richard Hugo, Stanley Kauffmann, Norman Mailer, Ian McEwan, James Merrill, W. S. Merwin, Leonard Michaels, Kate Millett, Conor Cruise O'Brien, Cynthia Ozick, Grace Paley, Sylvia Plath, J. F. Powers, V. S. Pritchett, Mordecai Richler, Theodore Roszak, Philip Roth, Lore Segal, Anne Sexton, Wilfrid Sheed, Susan Sontag, Gilbert Sorrentino, Robert Stone, James Welch, and Ellen Willis.

Looking back on American Review, Vanity Fair's James Wolcott said the publication "started off stellar and never lost altitude, never peaked out, continuing to make literary news back when literary news didn't seem like an oxymoron, each issue bearing something eventful...". Slate's Gerald Howard called it "the greatest American literary magazine ever."

References

Further reading

External links
Ted Solotaroff interview with Stephen Banker (1972) on YouTube

1967 establishments in the United States
1977 disestablishments in the United States
Defunct literary magazines published in the United States
Magazines established in 1967
Magazines disestablished in 1977
Magazines published in New York City